Frederick Henry Yelverton Powys (22 July 1808 – 14 January 1863) was an English cricketer who was associated with Cambridge University and made his first-class debut in 1830.

Powys was a grandson of Thomas Powys, 1st Baron Lilford. He studied at Emmanuel College, Cambridge, and after graduating became a Church of England priest, but he held no cure or benefice.

References

1808 births
1863 deaths
English cricketers
English cricketers of 1826 to 1863
Cambridge University cricketers
Alumni of Emmanuel College, Cambridge
19th-century English Anglican priests